Gareth Paddison (born 13 May 1980) is a New Zealand professional golfer who plays on the PGA Tour of Australasia.

Amateur career
Paddison won the New Zealand Amateur Stroke Play Championship and the Queensland Amateur Championship 1999 and the Canadian Amateur Championship in 2001. He also represented New Zealand at the 2000 Eisenhower Trophy.

Professional career
Paddison turned professional in 2001. He was named the Norman Von Nida Australasian PGA Tour Rookie of the Year in 2002 after he won the Scenic Circle Hotels Dunedin Classic. He  played on the Challenge Tour from 2002 to 2007. In 2002 he finished in third at the Izki Challenge de España. In 2004 he won the Victorian Open on the Von Nida Tour while finishing in a tie for second at the Skandia PGA Open on the Challenge Tour. He picked up his first win on the Challenge Tour in 2007 at the Open des Volcans. He earned his European Tour card for 2008 by going through qualifying school but he wasn't able to retain his card even though he recorded five top-25 finishes, and returned to the Challenge tour for 2009.

From 2010 Paddison played mostly on the PGA Tour of Australasia and the OneAsia tour. He won three tier-2 events on the Australasian Tour, the Queensland PGA Championship in 2011 and the Victorian PGA Championship in 2012 and 2014. His best finish on the OneAsia tour was when he was a runner-up in the 2015 GS Caltex Maekyung Open in Korea. He played on the Asian Tour in 2018, having secured a place through Q-school. He has won 5 times on the Charles Tour and won the Fiji Open in 2016.

Personal life
His father, Garry, played for the New Zealand national football team in the 1970s.

Amateur wins
1999 New Zealand Amateur Stroke Play Championship, Queensland Amateur Championship
2000 SBS Invitational
2001 Canadian Amateur Championship

Professional wins (13)

PGA Tour of Australasia wins (4)

Challenge Tour wins (1)

Von Nida Tour wins (1)

Charles Tour wins (5)

Other wins (2)
2000 Waikato Strokeplay Championship
2016 Fiji Open

Team appearances
Amateur
Nomura Cup (representing New Zealand): 1999
Eisenhower Trophy (representing New Zealand): 2000
Four Nations Cup (representing New Zealand): 2001
Southern Cross Cup (representing New Zealand): 2001

Professional
World Cup (representing New Zealand): 2011

See also
2007 European Tour Qualifying School graduates

References

External links

New Zealand male golfers
PGA Tour of Australasia golfers
European Tour golfers
Left-handed golfers
Sportspeople from Wellington City
1980 births
Living people